Gar Kandi (also Romanized as Gār Kandī and Gar Kandī; also known as Kār Gandī) is a village in Polan Rural District, Polan District, Chabahar County, Sistan and Baluchestan Province, Iran. At the 2006 census, its population was 311, in 69 families.

References 

Populated places in Chabahar County